The Black Tortoise is one of the Four Symbols of the Chinese constellations. Despite its English name, it is usually depicted as a tortoise entwined together with a snake. The name  used in East Asian languages does not mention either animal; the alternative name "Black Warrior ~ Dark Warrior ~ Mysterious Warrior" is a more faithful translation.

It represents the north and the winter season, thus it is sometimes called Xuanwu (Black Tortoise, lit. Black Warrior) of the North.

In Japan, it is named Genbu. It is said to protect Kyoto on the north side, being one of the four guardian spirits that protect the city. It is represented by the Kenkun Shrine, which is located on top of Mt Funaoka in Kyoto.

The creature's name is identical to that of the important Taoist god Xuanwu, who is sometimes (as in Journey to the West) portrayed in the company of a turtle and a snake.

History 

During the Han dynasty, people often wore jade pendants that were in the shape of turtles. Originally there was a legend that said that turtles could not mate with other turtles only snakes so this is why the black tortoise is with the snake on its back.

The northern gates of Chinese palaces were often named after the Xuanwu. Most famously, the Incident at Xuanwu Gate, where Li Shimin killed his brothers Jiancheng and Yuanji and seized power in a coup, took place at the north gate of the Taiji Palace, in the north of Chang'an.

Legends 

In ancient China, the tortoise and the serpent were thought to be spiritual creatures symbolizing longevity. The Min people custom of building turtle-shaped tombs may have had to do with the desire to place the grave under the influence of the Black Tortoise.

Xuanwu 

In the classic novel Journey to the West, Xuanwu was a king of the north who had two generals serving under him, a "Tortoise General" and a "Snake General". This god had a temple in the Wudang Mountains of Hubei and there are now a "Tortoise Mountain" and a "Snake Mountain" on opposite sides of a river near Wuhan, Hubei's capital. Taoist legend has it that Xuanwu was the prince of a Chinese ruler but was not interested in taking the throne, opting instead to leave his parents at age 16 and study Taoism. According to the legend, he eventually achieved divine status and was worshiped as a deity of the northern sky.

Other Chinese legends also speak of how the "Tortoise General" and a "Snake General" came to be. During Xuanwu's study to achieve enlightenment and divine status, he was told that, in order to fully achieve divinity, he must purge all human flesh from his body. Since he had always eaten the food of the world, despite all his efforts, his stomach and intestines were still human. A god then came and changed his organs with divine ones. Once removed, the original stomach and intestines were said to have become a tortoise and a snake, respectively. The tortoise and snake became demons and terrorized people. Now divine, Xuanwu heard of this and returned to slay the monsters he had unleashed on the countryside. However, as the snake and tortoise showed remorse, he did not kill them but instead let them train under him to atone for their wrongdoings. They then became the Tortoise and Snake generals and assisted Xuanwu with his quests (another legend held that the mortal organs were tossed out to become Wuhan's Tortoise and Snake mountains).

According to another source, once Xuanwu had begun his study of the Way, he discovered that he must purge himself of all of his past sins to become a god. He learned to achieve this by washing his stomach and intestines in the river. Washing his internal organs, his sins dissolved into the water in a dark, black form. These then formed into a black tortoise and a snake who terrorized the country. Once Xuanwu learned of this, he returned to subdue them as in the other story.

Seven Mansions of the Black Tortoise 

As with the other three Symbols, there are seven astrological "Mansions" (positions of the Moon) within the Black Tortoise. The names and determinative stars are:

See also 
Ao - the great turtle of early Chinese mythology
Bixi - the son of the Dragon King who supports Chinese stelæ
Cetus in Chinese astronomy - Cetus and Black Tortoise correspond on astrology, and both creatures possess affinities to waters and travel to underworlds to guide people 
Fushigi Yûgi: Genbu Kaiden
 Enamorus

References

External links 

 "Star Charts and Moon Stations"
 The Black Tortoise of the North

Chinese constellations
Chinese legendary creatures
Four Symbols
Guardians of the directions
Japanese legendary creatures
Legendary turtles
Onmyōdō deities